"One Day at a Time" is a popular Country and Western-style Christian song written by Marijohn Wilkin and Kris Kristofferson. It has been recorded by over 200 artists and has reached No.1 in several territories. Scottish singer Lena Martell had a UK Singles Chart number one with her version in 1979.

Marilyn Sellars version
The song was first recorded by American Country singer Marilyn Sellars in 1974. This version became a US top 40 hit and top 20 hit on the Country Charts. Following this, it won the 1975 Gospel Music Association (GMA) Dove Awards for best song.

Chart positions

Gloria version

"One Day at a Time" was recorded by Gloria who released it as a single in August 1977. The song originally peaked at No.5 in the Irish singles charts, before being re-released a year later. From here it peaked at No.1 (over a year after it had entered the chart) and remained on the charts throughout the whole of 1979 and into 1980, eventually spending a total of 90 weeks in the Irish top 30 - the longest run by any song in Irish Chart history.

Chart history

Cristy Lane version

"One Day at a Time" became best known among country fans when recorded by American country gospel singer Cristy Lane. Lane had started enjoying mainstream success in the late 1970s through the release of several secular hits, including "Let Me Down Easy" and "Simple Little Words." In 1979, Lane recorded the song after it became a No. 1 hit in the United Kingdom by Lena Martell. At first, United Artists Records balked at releasing the song, despite its previous track record of success, but Lane's husband-manager, Lee Stoller, predicted the song would be successful, and UA relented. The song was released in the late winter of 1980, and by the end of the spring, the song was No. 1 on the Billboard Hot Country Singles chart.

"One Day at a Time" was Lane's only No. 1 hit. For Kristofferson, the song was his sixth No. 1 as a songwriter and first in six years (his last being 1974's "Please Don't Tell Me How the Story Ends" by Ronnie Milsap).

Chart positions

Year-end charts

Other versions
The song went on to be recorded by many artists. Scottish singer Lena Martell recorded the song for the UK market in 1979. The song again became a big success and reached No. 1 in the UK Singles Chart in October 1979 for three weeks. The song was also recorded by the following; Paulino Bernal & Ricardo Mejia, in the album Misioneros De Cristo, they were the first to record the song in Spanish "Un Dia A La Vez". Javier Galvan [Tejano Gospel Singer] also recorded the Spanish version "Un Dia a La Vez";[Los Tigres Del Norte], though Paulino and Ricardo recorded it first; The Alexander Brothers; Judy Collins; Phil Coulter; Floyd Cramer; Carlene Davis; Florida Boys; Roger Whittaker; Tennessee Ernie Ford; Foster and Allen; Bill Gaither; Lynda Randle; Ivan Parker; Don Gibson; Arthur Greenslade; Lee Greenwood; Roy Drusky; George Hamilton IV; Lulu Roman, Brotherhood of Man and the Quebec country singer André Breton recorded the French version "Un jour à la fois". Memorable version by 93-year-old Nita Talley also deserves honourable mention here.

See also
 Dove Award for Song of the Year

References

UK Singles Chart number-one singles
Irish Singles Chart number-one singles
Gospel songs
Contemporary Christian songs
Marilyn Sellars songs
Kris Kristofferson songs
Cristy Lane songs
Songs written by Marijohn Wilkin
Songs written by Kris Kristofferson
1974 songs